Ashok Yadav is a leader of the Rashtriya Janata Dal and a member of the Bihar Legislative Council from Nawada. He is a nephew of former member of the Bihar Legislative Assembly from Nawada constituency, Raj Ballabh Yadav. His term is 2022 to 2028.

References

Members of the Bihar Legislative Council
Rashtriya Janata Dal politicians
Living people
Year of birth missing (living people)